Euclidean geometry is a mathematical system attributed to  ancient Greek mathematician Euclid, which he described in his textbook on geometry; Elements. Euclid's approach consists in assuming a small set of intuitively appealing axioms (postulates) and deducing many other propositions (theorems) from these. Although many of Euclid's results had been stated earlier, Euclid was the first to organize these propositions into a logical system in which each result is proved from axioms and previously proved theorems. 

The Elements begins with plane geometry, still taught in secondary school (high school) as the first axiomatic system and the first examples of mathematical proofs. It goes on to the solid geometry of three dimensions. Much of the Elements states results of what are now called algebra and number theory, explained in geometrical language.

For more than two thousand years, the adjective "Euclidean" was unnecessary because no other sort of geometry had been conceived. Euclid's axioms seemed so intuitively obvious (with the possible exception of the parallel postulate) that any theorem proved from them was deemed true in an absolute, often metaphysical, sense. Today, however, many other self-consistent non-Euclidean geometries are known, the first ones having been discovered in the early 19th century. An implication of Albert Einstein's theory of general relativity is that physical space itself is not Euclidean, and Euclidean space is a good approximation for it only over short distances (relative to the strength of the  gravitational field).

Euclidean geometry is an example of synthetic geometry, in that it proceeds logically from axioms describing basic properties of geometric objects such as points and lines, to propositions about those objects. This is in contrast to analytic geometry, introduced almost 2,000 years later by René Descartes, which uses coordinates to express geometric properties as algebraic formulas.

The Elements

The Elements is mainly a systematization of earlier knowledge of geometry. Its improvement over earlier treatments was rapidly recognized, with the result that there was little interest in preserving the earlier ones, and they are now nearly all lost.

There are 13 books in the Elements:

Books I–IV and VI discuss plane geometry. Many results about plane figures are proved, for example, "In any triangle, two angles taken together in any manner are less than two right angles." (Book I proposition 17) and the Pythagorean theorem "In right-angled triangles the square on the side subtending the right angle is equal to the squares on the sides containing the right angle." (Book I, proposition 47)

Books V and VII–X deal with number theory, with numbers treated geometrically as lengths of line segments or areas of surface regions. Notions such as prime numbers and rational and irrational numbers are introduced. It is proved that there are infinitely many prime numbers.

Books XI–XIII concern solid geometry. A typical result is the 1:3 ratio between the volume of a cone and a cylinder with the same height and base. The platonic solids are constructed.

Axioms

Euclidean geometry is an axiomatic system, in which all theorems ("true statements") are derived from a small number of simple axioms. Until the advent of non-Euclidean geometry, these axioms were considered to be obviously true in the physical world, so that all the theorems would be equally true. However, Euclid's reasoning from assumptions to conclusions remains valid independent of their physical reality.

Near the beginning of the first book of the Elements, Euclid gives five postulates (axioms) for plane geometry, stated in terms of constructions (as translated by Thomas Heath):

Let the following be postulated:
 To draw a straight line from any point to any point.
 To produce (extend) a finite straight line continuously in a straight line.
 To describe a circle with any centre and distance (radius).
 That all right angles are equal to one another.
 [The parallel postulate]: That, if a straight line falling on two straight lines make the interior angles on the same side less than two right angles, the two straight lines, if produced indefinitely, meet on that side on which the angles are less than two right angles.

Although Euclid explicitly only asserts the existence of the constructed objects, in his reasoning he also implicitly assumes them to be unique.

The Elements also include the following five "common notions":

 Things that are equal to the same thing are also equal to one another (the transitive property of a Euclidean relation).
 If equals are added to equals, then the wholes are equal (Addition property of equality).
 If equals are subtracted from equals, then the differences are equal (subtraction property of equality).
 Things that coincide with one another are equal to one another (reflexive property).
 The whole is greater than the part.

Modern scholars agree that Euclid's postulates do not provide the complete logical foundation that Euclid required for his presentation. Modern treatments use more extensive and complete sets of axioms.

Parallel postulate

To the ancients, the parallel postulate seemed less obvious than the others. They aspired to create a system of absolutely certain propositions, and to them, it seemed as if the parallel line postulate required proof from simpler statements. It is now known that such a proof is impossible since one can construct consistent systems of geometry (obeying the other axioms) in which the parallel postulate is true, and others in which it is false. Euclid himself seems to have considered it as being qualitatively different from the others, as evidenced by the organization of the Elements: his first 28 propositions are those that can be proved without it.

Many alternative axioms can be formulated which are logically equivalent to the parallel postulate (in the context of the other axioms). For example, Playfair's axiom states:

In a plane, through a point not on a given straight line, at most one line can be drawn that never meets the given line.

The "at most" clause is all that is needed since it can be proved from the remaining axioms that at least one parallel line exists.

Methods of proof
Euclidean Geometry is constructive. Postulates 1, 2, 3, and 5 assert the existence and uniqueness of certain geometric figures, and these assertions are of a constructive nature: that is, we are not only told that certain things exist, but are also given methods for creating them with no more than a compass and an unmarked straightedge. In this sense, Euclidean geometry is more concrete than many modern axiomatic systems such as set theory, which often assert the existence of objects without saying how to construct them, or even assert the existence of objects that cannot be constructed within the theory. Strictly speaking, the lines on paper are models of the objects defined within the formal system, rather than instances of those objects. For example, a Euclidean straight line has no width, but any real drawn line will. Though nearly all modern mathematicians consider nonconstructive methods just as sound as constructive ones, Euclid's constructive proofs often supplanted fallacious nonconstructive ones—e.g., some of the Pythagoreans' proofs that involved irrational numbers, which usually required a statement such as "Find the greatest common measure of ..."

Euclid often used proof by contradiction. Euclidean geometry also allows the method of superposition, in which a figure is transferred to another point in space. For example, proposition I.4, side-angle-side congruence of triangles, is proved by moving one of the two triangles so that one of its sides coincides with the other triangle's equal side, and then proving that the other sides coincide as well. Some modern treatments add a sixth postulate, the rigidity of the triangle, which can be used as an alternative to superposition.

Notation and terminology

Naming of points and figures
Points are customarily named using capital letters of the alphabet. Other figures, such as lines, triangles, or circles, are named by listing a sufficient number of points to pick them out unambiguously from the relevant figure, e.g., triangle ABC would typically be a triangle with vertices at points A, B, and C.

Complementary and supplementary angles 
Angles whose sum is a right angle are called complementary. Complementary angles are formed when a ray shares the same vertex and is pointed in a direction that is in between the two original rays that form the right angle. The number of rays in between the two original rays is infinite.

Angles whose sum is a straight angle are supplementary. Supplementary angles are formed when a ray shares the same vertex and is pointed in a direction that is in between the two original rays that form the straight angle (180 degree angle). The number of rays in between the two original rays is infinite.

Modern versions of Euclid's notation 
In modern terminology, angles would normally be measured in degrees or radians.

Modern school textbooks often define separate figures called lines (infinite), rays (semi-infinite), and line segments (of finite length). Euclid, rather than discussing a ray as an object that extends to infinity in one direction, would normally use locutions such as "if the line is extended to a sufficient length", although he occasionally referred to "infinite lines". A "line" in Euclid could be either straight or curved, and he used the more specific term "straight line" when necessary.

Some important or well known results

Pons asinorum
The pons asinorum (bridge of asses) states that in isosceles triangles the angles at the base equal one another, and, if the equal straight lines are produced further, then the angles under the base equal one another. Its name may be attributed to its frequent role as the first real test in the Elements of the intelligence of the reader and as a bridge to the harder propositions that followed. It might also be so named because of the geometrical figure's resemblance to a steep bridge that only a sure-footed donkey could cross.

Congruence of triangles

Triangles are congruent if they have all three sides equal (SSS), two sides and the angle between them equal (SAS), or two angles and a side equal (ASA) (Book I, propositions 4, 8, and 26). Triangles with three equal angles (AAA) are similar, but not necessarily congruent. Also, triangles with two equal sides and an adjacent angle are not necessarily equal or congruent.

Triangle angle sum
The sum of the angles of a triangle is equal to a straight angle (180 degrees). This causes an equilateral triangle to have three interior angles of 60 degrees. Also, it causes every triangle to have at least two acute angles and up to one obtuse or right angle.

Pythagorean theorem
The celebrated Pythagorean theorem (book I, proposition 47) states that in any right triangle, the area of the square whose side is the hypotenuse (the side opposite the right angle) is equal to the sum of the areas of the squares whose sides are the two legs (the two sides that meet at a right angle).

Thales' theorem
Thales' theorem, named after Thales of Miletus states that if A, B, and C are points on a circle where the line AC is a diameter of the circle, then the angle ABC is a right angle. Cantor supposed that Thales proved his theorem by means of Euclid Book I, Prop. 32 after the manner of Euclid Book III, Prop. 31.

Scaling of area and volume
In modern terminology, the area of a plane figure is proportional to the square of any of its linear dimensions, and the volume of a solid to the cube, . Euclid proved these results in various special cases such as the area of a circle and the volume of a parallelepipedal solid. Euclid determined some, but not all, of the relevant constants of proportionality. E.g., it was his successor Archimedes who proved that a sphere has 2/3 the volume of the circumscribing cylinder.

System of measurement and arithmetic
Euclidean geometry has two fundamental types of measurements: angle and distance. The angle scale is absolute, and Euclid uses the right angle as his basic unit, so that, for example, a 45-degree angle would be referred to as half of a right angle. The distance scale is relative; one arbitrarily picks a line segment with a certain nonzero length as the unit, and other distances are expressed in relation to it. Addition of distances is represented by a construction in which one line segment is copied onto the end of another line segment to extend its length, and similarly for subtraction.

Measurements of area and volume are derived from distances. For example, a rectangle with a width of 3 and a length of 4 has an area that represents the product, 12. Because this geometrical interpretation of multiplication was limited to three dimensions, there was no direct way of interpreting the product of four or more numbers, and Euclid avoided such products, although they are implied, for example in the proof of book IX, proposition 20.

Euclid refers to a pair of lines, or a pair of planar or solid figures, as "equal" (ἴσος) if their lengths, areas, or volumes are equal respectively, and similarly for angles. The stronger term "congruent" refers to the idea that an entire figure is the same size and shape as another figure. Alternatively, two figures are congruent if one can be moved on top of the other so that it matches up with it exactly. (Flipping it over is allowed.) Thus, for example, a 2x6 rectangle and a 3x4 rectangle are equal but not congruent, and the letter R is congruent to its mirror image. Figures that would be congruent except for their differing sizes are referred to as similar. Corresponding angles in a pair of similar shapes are congruent and corresponding sides are in proportion to each other.

Applications
Because of Euclidean geometry's fundamental status in mathematics, it is impractical to give more than a representative sampling of applications here.

As suggested by the etymology of the word, one of the earliest reasons for interest in and also one of the most common current use of geometry is surveying, and certain practical results from Euclidean geometry, such as the right-angle property of the 3-4-5 triangle, were used long before they were proved formally. The fundamental types of measurements in Euclidean geometry are distances and angles, both of which can be measured directly by a surveyor. Historically, distances were often measured by chains, such as Gunter's chain, and angles using graduated circles and, later, the theodolite.

An application of Euclidean solid geometry is the determination of packing arrangements, such as the problem of finding the most efficient packing of spheres in n dimensions. This problem has applications in error detection and correction.

Geometric optics uses Euclidean geometry to analyze the focusing of light by lenses and mirrors.

Geometry is used extensively in architecture.

Geometry can be used to design origami. Some classical construction problems of geometry are impossible using compass and straightedge, but can be solved using origami.

Much of CAD (computer-aided design) and CAM (computer-aided manufacturing) is based on Euclidean geometry. Design geometry typically consists of shapes bounded by planes, cylinders, cones, tori, and other similar shapes. In the present day, CAD/CAM is essential in the design of almost everything, including cars, airplanes, ships, and smartphones. A few decades ago, sophisticated draftsmen would learn fairly advanced Euclidean geometry, including things like Pascal's theorem and Brianchon's theorem, but in modern times this is no longer necessary.

Later history

Archimedes and Apollonius

Archimedes (c. 287 BCE – c. 212 BCE), a colorful figure about whom many historical anecdotes are recorded, is remembered along with Euclid as one of the greatest of ancient mathematicians. Although the foundations of his work were put in place by Euclid, his work, unlike Euclid's, is believed to have been entirely original. He proved equations for the volumes and areas of various figures in two and three dimensions, and enunciated the Archimedean property of finite numbers.

Apollonius of Perga (c. 262 BCE – c. 190 BCE) is mainly known for his investigation of conic sections.

17th century: Descartes
René Descartes (1596–1650) developed analytic geometry, an alternative method for formalizing geometry which focused on turning geometry into algebra.

In this approach, a point on a plane is represented by its Cartesian (x, y) coordinates, a line is represented by its equation, and so on.

In Euclid's original approach, the Pythagorean theorem follows from Euclid's axioms. In the Cartesian approach, the axioms are the axioms of algebra, and the equation expressing the Pythagorean theorem is then a definition of one of the terms in Euclid's axioms, which are now considered theorems.

The equation

defining the distance between two points P = (px, py) and Q = (qx, qy) is then known as the Euclidean metric, and other metrics define non-Euclidean geometries.

In terms of analytic geometry, the restriction of classical geometry to compass and straightedge constructions means a restriction to first- and second-order equations, e.g., y = 2x + 1 (a line), or x2 + y2 = 7 (a circle).

Also in the 17th century, Girard Desargues, motivated by the theory of perspective, introduced the concept of idealized points, lines, and planes at infinity. The result can be considered as a type of generalized geometry, projective geometry, but it can also be used to produce proofs in ordinary Euclidean geometry in which the number of special cases is reduced.

18th century
Geometers of the 18th century struggled to define the boundaries of the Euclidean system. Many tried in vain to prove the fifth postulate from the first four. By 1763, at least 28 different proofs had been published, but all were found incorrect.

Leading up to this period, geometers also tried to determine what constructions could be accomplished in Euclidean geometry. For example, the problem of trisecting an angle with a compass and straightedge is one that naturally occurs within the theory, since the axioms refer to constructive operations that can be carried out with those tools. However, centuries of efforts failed to find a solution to this problem, until Pierre Wantzel published a proof in 1837 that such a construction was impossible. Other constructions that were proved impossible include doubling the cube and squaring the circle. In the case of doubling the cube, the impossibility of the construction originates from the fact that the compass and straightedge method involve equations whose order is an integral power of two, while doubling a cube requires the solution of a third-order equation.

Euler discussed a generalization of Euclidean geometry called affine geometry, which retains the fifth postulate unmodified while weakening postulates three and four in a way that eliminates the notions of angle (whence right triangles become meaningless) and of equality of length of line segments in general (whence circles become meaningless) while retaining the notions of parallelism as an equivalence relation between lines, and equality of length of parallel line segments (so line segments continue to have a midpoint).

19th century

In the early 19th century, Carnot and Möbius systematically developed the use of signed angles and line segments as a way of simplifying and unifying results.

Higher dimensions
In the 1840s William Rowan Hamilton developed the quaternions, and John T. Graves and Arthur Cayley the octonions. These are normed algebras which extend the complex numbers. Later it was understood that the quaternions are also a Euclidean geometric system with four real Cartesian coordinates. Cayley used quaternions to study rotations in 4-dimensional Euclidean space.

At mid-century Ludwig Schläfli developed the general concept of Euclidean space, extending Euclidean geometry to higher dimensions. He defined polyschemes, later called polytopes, which are the higher-dimensional analogues of polygons and polyhedra. He developed their theory and discovered all the regular polytopes, i.e. the -dimensional analogues of regular polygons and Platonic solids. He found there are six regular convex polytopes in dimension four, and three in all higher dimensions.

Schläfli performed this work in relative obscurity and it was published in full only posthumously in 1901. It had little influence until it was rediscovered and fully documented in 1948 by H.S.M. Coxeter.

In 1878 William Kingdon Clifford introduced what is now termed geometric algebra, unifying Hamilton's quaternions with Hermann Grassmann's algebra and revealing the geometric nature of these systems, especially in four dimensions. The operations of geometric algebra have the effect of mirroring, rotating, translating, and mapping the geometric objects that are being modeled to new positions. The Clifford torus on the surface of the 3-sphere is the simplest and most symmetric flat embedding of the Cartesian product of two circles (in the same sense that the surface of a cylinder is "flat").

Non-Euclidean geometry

The century's most influential development in geometry occurred when, around 1830, János Bolyai and Nikolai Ivanovich Lobachevsky separately published work on non-Euclidean geometry, in which the parallel postulate is not valid. Since non-Euclidean geometry is provably relatively consistent with Euclidean geometry, the parallel postulate cannot be proved from the other postulates.

In the 19th century, it was also realized that Euclid's ten axioms and common notions do not suffice to prove all of the theorems stated in the Elements. For example, Euclid assumed implicitly that any line contains at least two points, but this assumption cannot be proved from the other axioms, and therefore must be an axiom itself. The very first geometric proof in the Elements, shown in the figure above, is that any line segment is part of a triangle; Euclid constructs this in the usual way, by drawing circles around both endpoints and taking their intersection as the third vertex. His axioms, however, do not guarantee that the circles actually intersect, because they do not assert the geometrical property of continuity, which in Cartesian terms is equivalent to the completeness property of the real numbers. Starting with Moritz Pasch in 1882, many improved axiomatic systems for geometry have been proposed, the best known being those of Hilbert, George Birkhoff, and Tarski.

20th century and relativity

Einstein's theory of special relativity involves a four-dimensional space-time, the Minkowski space, which is non-Euclidean. This shows that non-Euclidean geometries, which had been introduced a few years earlier for showing that the parallel postulate cannot be proved, are also useful for describing the physical world.

However, the three-dimensional "space part" of the Minkowski space remains the space of Euclidean geometry. This is not the case with general relativity, for which the geometry of the space part of space-time is not Euclidean geometry. For example, if a triangle is constructed out of three rays of light, then in general the interior angles do not add up to 180 degrees due to gravity. A relatively weak gravitational field, such as the Earth's or the Sun's, is represented by a metric that is approximately, but not exactly, Euclidean. Until the 20th century, there was no technology capable of detecting these deviations in rays of light from Euclidean geometry, but Einstein predicted that such deviations would exist. They were later verified by observations such as the slight bending of starlight by the Sun during a solar eclipse in 1919, and such considerations are now an integral part of the software that runs the GPS system.

As a description of the structure of space
Euclid believed that his axioms were self-evident statements about physical reality. Euclid's proofs depend upon assumptions perhaps not obvious in Euclid's fundamental axioms, in particular that certain movements of figures do not change their geometrical properties such as the lengths of sides and interior angles, the so-called Euclidean motions, which include translations, reflections and rotations of figures. Taken as a physical description of space, postulate 2 (extending a line) asserts that space does not have holes or boundaries; postulate 4 (equality of right angles) says that space is isotropic and figures may be moved to any location while maintaining congruence; and postulate 5 (the parallel postulate) that space is flat (has no intrinsic curvature).

As discussed above, Albert Einstein's theory of relativity significantly modifies this view.

The ambiguous character of the axioms as originally formulated by Euclid makes it possible for different commentators to disagree about some of their other implications for the structure of space, such as whether or not it is infinite (see below) and what its topology is. Modern, more rigorous reformulations of the system typically aim for a cleaner separation of these issues. Interpreting Euclid's axioms in the spirit of this more modern approach, axioms 1–4 are consistent with either infinite or finite space (as in elliptic geometry), and all five axioms are consistent with a variety of topologies (e.g., a plane, a cylinder, or a torus for two-dimensional Euclidean geometry).

Treatment of infinity

Infinite objects
Euclid sometimes distinguished explicitly between "finite lines" (e.g., Postulate 2) and "infinite lines" (book I, proposition 12). However, he typically did not make such distinctions unless they were necessary. The postulates do not explicitly refer to infinite lines, although for example some commentators interpret postulate 3, existence of a circle with any radius, as implying that space is infinite.

The notion of infinitesimal quantities had previously been discussed extensively by the Eleatic School, but nobody had been able to put them on a firm logical basis, with paradoxes such as Zeno's paradox occurring that had not been resolved to universal satisfaction. Euclid used the method of exhaustion rather than infinitesimals.

Later ancient commentators, such as Proclus (410–485 CE), treated many questions about infinity as issues demanding proof and, e.g., Proclus claimed to prove the infinite divisibility of a line, based on a proof by contradiction in which he considered the cases of even and odd numbers of points constituting it.

At the turn of the 20th century, Otto Stolz, Paul du Bois-Reymond, Giuseppe Veronese, and others produced controversial work on non-Archimedean models of Euclidean geometry, in which the distance between two points may be infinite or infinitesimal, in the Newton–Leibniz sense. Fifty years later, Abraham Robinson provided a rigorous logical foundation for Veronese's work.

Infinite processes
Ancient geometers may have considered the parallel postulate – that two parallel lines do not ever intersect – less certain than the others because it makes a statement about infinitely remote regions of space, and so cannot be physically verified.

The modern formulation of proof by induction was not developed until the 17th century, but some later commentators consider it implicit in some of Euclid's proofs, e.g., the proof of the infinitude of primes.

Supposed paradoxes involving infinite series, such as Zeno's paradox, predated Euclid. Euclid avoided such discussions, giving, for example, the expression for the partial sums of the geometric series in IX.35 without commenting on the possibility of letting the number of terms become infinite.

Logical basis

Classical logic
Euclid frequently used the method of proof by contradiction, and therefore the traditional presentation of Euclidean geometry assumes classical logic, in which every proposition is either true or false, i.e., for any proposition P, the proposition "P or not P" is automatically true.

Modern standards of rigor
Placing Euclidean geometry on a solid axiomatic basis was a preoccupation of mathematicians for centuries. The role of primitive notions, or undefined concepts, was clearly put forward by Alessandro Padoa of the Peano delegation at the 1900 Paris conference: 

That is, mathematics is context-independent knowledge within a hierarchical framework. As said by Bertrand Russell:

Such foundational approaches range between foundationalism and formalism.

Axiomatic formulations

Euclid's axioms: In his dissertation to Trinity College, Cambridge, Bertrand Russell summarized the changing role of Euclid's geometry in the minds of philosophers up to that time. It was a conflict between certain knowledge, independent of experiment, and empiricism, requiring experimental input. This issue became clear as it was discovered that the parallel postulate was not necessarily valid and its applicability was an empirical matter, deciding whether the applicable geometry was Euclidean or non-Euclidean.
Hilbert's axioms: Hilbert's axioms had the goal of identifying a simple and complete set of independent axioms from which the most important geometric theorems could be deduced. The outstanding objectives were to make Euclidean geometry rigorous (avoiding hidden assumptions) and to make clear the ramifications of the parallel postulate.
Birkhoff's axioms: Birkhoff proposed four postulates for Euclidean geometry that can be confirmed experimentally with scale and protractor. This system relies heavily on the properties of the real numbers. The notions of angle and distance become primitive concepts.
Tarski's axioms: Alfred Tarski (1902–1983) and his students defined elementary Euclidean geometry as the geometry that can be expressed in first-order logic and does not depend on set theory for its logical basis, in contrast to Hilbert's axioms, which involve point sets. Tarski proved that his axiomatic formulation of elementary Euclidean geometry is consistent and complete in a certain sense: there is an algorithm that, for every proposition, can be shown either true or false. (This doesn't violate Gödel's theorem, because Euclidean geometry cannot describe a sufficient amount of arithmetic for the theorem to apply.) This is equivalent to the decidability of real closed fields, of which elementary Euclidean geometry is a model.

See also
Absolute geometry
Analytic geometry
Birkhoff's axioms
Cartesian coordinate system
Hilbert's axioms
Incidence geometry
List of interactive geometry software
Metric space
Non-Euclidean geometry
Ordered geometry
Parallel postulate
Type theory

Classical theorems
Angle bisector theorem
Butterfly theorem
Ceva's theorem
Heron's formula
Menelaus' theorem
Nine-point circle
Pythagorean theorem

Notes

References

 In 3 vols.: vol. 1 , vol. 2 , vol. 3 . Heath's authoritative translation of Euclid's Elements, plus his extensive historical research and detailed commentary throughout the text.

External links

Kiran Kedlaya, Geometry Unbound (a treatment using analytic geometry; PDF format, GFDL licensed)

 

Greek inventions